The 2008 Ireland rugby union tour of New Zealand and Australia was a series of matches played in June 2008 in New Zealand and Australia by Ireland national rugby union team.

Matches

Touring Party 
 Manager: Michael Bradley
 Captain: Brian O'Driscoll

Backs

Forwards

See also
 History of rugby union matches between Australia and Ireland 
 History of rugby union matches between Ireland and New Zealand

References

2008
2008
2008 rugby union tours
2008 in Australian rugby union
2008 in New Zealand rugby union
tour